Underdog is a 2007 American superhero comedy film based on W. Watts Biggers, Chet Stover, and Joe Harris‘ 1960s animated television series of the same name, which in turn is a spoof on the DC Comics character Superman, created by Jerry Siegel and Joe Shuster. Directed by Frederik Du Chau and written by Joe Piscatella, Adam Rifkin, and Craig A. Williams, the film stars Jim Belushi, Peter Dinklage, John Slattery, and Patrick Warburton with the voice talents of Jason Lee, Amy Adams, and Brad Garrett. Unlike the TV series, the Underdog character is portrayed as a regular dog rather than an anthropomorphic one. Underdog, voiced by Jason Lee, was played by a lemon beagle named Shoeshine sporting a red sweater and a blue cape. The film grossed $65.3 million worldwide. It has  approval rating on Rotten Tomatoes, which called it "mostly forgettable."

Plot

In the Capital City Town Hall, a beagle on the police bomb squad sets off a false alarm. Ridiculed and rejected, the beagle leaves in shame and is abducted off of the street by Cad Lackey, who takes him to Simon Barsinister's lab, where Cad works as an assistant. Bitter that his proposal for genetic experimentation was declined, Barsinister plans to prove the mayor wrong by testing his new serum on the beagle. The beagle escapes and runs amok in the lab, starting a fire and becoming exposed to various chemicals, which modify his DNA and give him superpowers.

After his escape, the beagle avoids an encounter with a Rottweiler named Riff Raff and his lackeys. Dan Unger strikes the beagle with his car, but thanks to the serum, the dog is unharmed. Dan takes him home and names him Shoeshine after the dog licks his shoes. Dan's teenage son, Jack, becomes jealous of Shoeshine's attention. Dan retired from the police to spend more time with Jack after his wife's death but still seems busy. Still unaware of his new powers, Shoeshine accidentally makes a large mess when left home alone. When Jack returns, Shoeshine shocks both of them by verbally apologizing. After the initial shock passes, Jack and Shoeshine talk and bond over their respective attraction to Molly and Polly, Jack's friend and her dog. The two friends then test Shoeshine's powers, discovering he has super speed, strength, hearing, and smell in the process.

When Molly and Polly are kidnapped, Shoeshine rushes to their aid, discovering he can fly. After discreetly rescuing them, Shoeshine returns home with Jack, making him promise to never reveal his powers. Cad shows up at the door looking of Shoeshine, but Jack fools him into leaving. Barsinister and Cad later find a new lair beneath the city and plan a robbery to fund rebuilding the former's lab. Seeing Cad's heist on the news, Jack convinces Shoeshine to intervene. Shoeshine disguises himself as a fish, saves the hostages and defeats the thugs assisting Cad in the robbery. Cad, however, escapes. Adopting the alias "Underdog", Shoeshine becomes the city's resident superhero; donning a shrunken red sweater and blue cape as his disguise.

Barsinister repeatedly fails to recreate his serum and sends Cad to obtain a sample of Underdog's DNA. Shoeshine is rebuffed by Polly, but gets a date with her as Underdog. Cad fails to capture Underdog, but obtains his collar which contains his secret identity's name and address. Barsinister and Cad kidnap Dan and force him to call Shoeshine for help. Shoeshine and Jack attempt a rescue, but Barsinister uses both Jack and Dan as hostages to convince Shoeshine to give up his DNA. Barsinister synthesizes Underdog's superpowers into pills, feeds Shoeshine an antidote to the serum, and feeds the super pills to three trained German Shepherds. He and Cad leave the family trapped in the sewers, but Dan's police experience allows him to free everyone. They pursue Barsinister with a hypodermic needle filled with the antidote.

At the City Hall, Barsinister takes the mayor hostage and instructs Cad to attach a bomb rigged with a mind control serum to the roof; Molly and Polly follow Cad. Shoeshine smells the bomb and, conquering his self-doubt, enters the building despite having lost his powers. Cad discovers Molly and Polly and captures them and ties them up. During a scuffle with Barsinister, Shoeshine accidentally rips open Barsinister's pocket and swallows a super pill, restoring his powers. Shoeshine temporarily incapacitates the German Shepherds after he hears Molly and Polly call for help, but Barsinister ingests a pill and distracts Shoeshine by tossing a shield like a Frisbee. When the German Shepherds recover, Shoeshine convinces them to turn on Barsinister, who has not treated them well. While they restrain Barsinister, Underdog appears on the roof and saves Molly and Polly, instructing them to take the mind control serum to the police while he gets the bomb out of harm's way. After being reinstated and promoted by the mayor, Dan arrives and injects Barsinister with the antidote while arresting him. Underdog takes the bomb and buries it deep underground just before it explodes. Underdog tries to escape, but is caught in the explosion, launched into space, and is presumed dead. Amidst a mournful crowd, Underdog revives, leaving everyone overjoyed.

Dan is reinstated as a police officer, Barsinister and Cad are arrested for their crimes, and Shoeshine returns to protecting Capitol City as Underdog.

Cast
 Jim Belushi as Dan Unger, a former police officer turned security guard.
 Peter Dinklage as Dr. Simon Barsinister, a mad scientist and Underdog’s archenemy.
 Patrick Warburton as Cad Lackey, Simon Barsinister's henchman.
 John Slattery as the Mayor of Capital City
 Alex Neuberger as Jack Unger, the son of Dan who befriends Shoeshine.
 Taylor Momsen as Molly, Jack's friend and Polly's owner.
 Samantha Bee as Principal Helen Patterson, the principal of Jack and Molly's school.
 Susie Castillo as Diana Flores
 Timothy Crew as the Chief of Police
 Frank L. Ridley as Police Sergeant
 Jay Leno as Himself (cameo)

Voice cast
 Jason Lee as Shoeshine/Underdog, a Beagle  who becomes Jack's dog and a superhero to protect Capital City from Simon Barsinister.
 Amy Adams as Sweet Polly Purebred, a Cavalier King Charles Spaniel and Molly's dog who is the love interest of Shoeshine/Underdog.
 Brad Garrett as Riff Raff, a Rottweiler and the leader of the bully dogs.
 John DiMaggio as Bulldog, one of the bully dogs.
 DiMaggio also voices a Supershep
 Phil Morris as Maim ("Supershep #1")
 Michael Massee as Kill ("Supershep #2")
 Cam Clarke as Attack ("Supershep #3")
 Clarke also voices a Little Brown Dog, one of the bully dogs.
 Danny Mastrogiorgio as Crazy Dog
 Jess Harnell as Astronaut

Release
Underdog opened on August 3, 2007, in 3,013 theaters across the United States. It earned $11,585,121 on its opening weekend, placing in third behind The Bourne Ultimatum and the second weekend of The Simpsons Movie. The film closed on December 13, 2007, having grossed $43.8 million in the US box office and $21.5 million overseas for a worldwide total of $65.3 million.

The film was released on Blu-ray and DVD on December 18, 2007. Disney has no more plans to reissue this movie on any home media after the first home release, but it is available to purchase on iTunes.

Soundtrack
The licensed soundtrack album is only available as a download on various online music stores. It contains the original score by Randy Edelman and the hip hop rendition of the Underdog theme title, "Underdog Raps", performed by then-Disney star Kyle Massey, which received airplay on Radio Disney. The Plain White T's rendition of the theme, titled "Underdog Rocks", plays at the beginning of the film but was not included on the album.

Reception
The site's critical consensus reads, "Underdog is a mostly forgettable adaptation that relies far too heavily on recycled material and sloppy production." On Metacritic, the film has a score of 37 out of 100 based on 16 critics, indicating "generally unfavorable reviews". Audiences polled by CinemaScore gave the film an average grade of "A−" on an A+ to F scale.

See also
 2007 in film
 Cinema of the United States
 List of Underdog characters

References

External links

  
 
 
 

2007 films
2007 action comedy films
2000s buddy comedy films
2000s science fiction comedy films
2000s superhero comedy films
American action comedy films
American children's comedy films
American buddy comedy films
American science fiction comedy films
American superhero films
2000s English-language films
Films about dogs
Films about pets
Films based on television series
Films shot in Rhode Island
Live-action films based on animated series
Spyglass Entertainment films
Walt Disney Pictures films
Films produced by Roger Birnbaum
Films scored by Randy Edelman
2007 comedy films
Films directed by Frederik Du Chau
2000s American films
Films about father–son relationships
Mad scientist films
Parodies of Superman